Alberto Mondi (born 17 January 1984) is an Italian who lives and performs in South Korea as a television personality and businessman. He is currently a cast member in the talk show Non-Summit. He is a former footballer of Serie D.

Personal life

Education and work in South Korea

He attended Kangwon National University and was a Teaching Assistant there between September 2008 – July 2010.  Also in 2008, he was a trainee at the Embassy of Italy in Seoul for four months. From September 2010 – June 2011 he was a Research Analyst for The Korea Institute of Public Finance. Between June 2011 and September 2013, he was a Brand Ambassador for SABMiller's Peroni Nastro Azzurro beer.

He has been with Fiat Chrysler as a Sales Area Manager since October 2013, and a member of the board of directors of the Italian Chamber of Commerce in Korea since April 2013. He has written articles for the Korea and the World Economy Journal, the Korea Institute of Public Finance publications, and Newsweek Korea.

In October 2016, Mondi was awarded the Order of the Star of Italy as recognition for his contributions to both Italian and Korean cultures.

In addition to his native Italian language, he speaks Korean, English and Chinese.

Broadcast and acting career
In 2015, he wrote a column for the JoongAng Ilbo newspaper on topics like clothing fashion, tourism, and food.

Celebrity and endorsements
He is a model for Mr. Pizza. As a popular TV personality he is photographed on the celebrity scene in Seoul.

Filmography

Television series

Film

Radio

References

External links

1984 births
Living people
Fiat people
Italian television personalities
Italian businesspeople
Italian expatriates in South Korea
People from Mirano